Melissa Heni Mekameka Whaitiri (born 11 January 1965) is a New Zealand Labour Party politician and Member of the New Zealand House of Representatives. She was elected to Parliament in the 2013 Ikaroa-Rāwhiti by-election and is currently Minister of Customs, Minister for Veterans and Minister for Food Safety.

Early life
Whaitiri was born in Manutuke near Gisborne in 1965. Her parents were Wirangi Wiremu Whaitiri, a Korean War veteran, and Mei Whaitiri (née Irihapiti Robin), who was the model used for the Pania of the Reef statue in Napier in 1954. Whaitiri's father was a native speaker of te reo Māori who taught the language to his daughter. She has four siblings and was brought up in the Hastings suburb of Whakatu by a whānau of mostly freezing workers. She has affiliation to Rongowhakaata and Ngāti Kahungunu. At Karamu High School, she was head girl.

She first worked at a freezing works before obtaining a master's degree in education from Victoria University of Wellington. In both softball and netball, she competed to national level. She was selected by the Silver Ferns as a non-travelling reserve player. Her first professional job was for Parekura Horomia, then a manager in the Department of Labour, who made her wait eight hours before he saw her, but then hired her immediately. She later worked for the Māori Women's Welfare League before returning to the Department of Labour as deputy secretary. She worked as an adviser in Horomia's office when he was Minister of Māori Affairs. From 2009 until her election to Parliament, she was chief executive officer of Ngāti Kahungunu iwi.

Whaitiri has two sons. She is openly lesbian and was previously in a relationship with Kiri Allan.

Member of Parliament

Parekura Horomia, MP for Ikaroa-Rāwhiti since 1999, died on 29 April 2013. A by-election to fill his seat took place on 29 June of that year. 

Whaitiri defeated five others for the Labour nomination, including Hastings district councillor Henare O'Keefe, broadcaster Shane Taurima and Ngāti Kahungunu board member Hayden Hape. 

At his last election in 2011, Horomia had won a majority of 6,541 votes. Whaitiri won the by-election with a majority of 1659 votes over Mana Party candidate Te Hamua Nikora. Māori Party candidate Na Raihania, who had also been endorsed by National, came third. Right-wing political blogger David Farrar called the by-election a "good victory for Labour", and commented that Whaitiri "could be one of the better Labour MPs".

Whaitiri was re-elected in the elections of 2014, 2017 and 2020. As an opposition MP for her first two terms, she was Labour Party spokesperson on water (2014–2015) and local government (2015–2017), and a member of the Māori affairs, primary production, and local government and environment select committees. She was a minister in the Sixth Labour Government from 2017 to 2018, when she was removed for assaulting a staff member, and again from 2020. During the interregnum she chaired the Justice select committee.

Government Minister 
After the 2017 general election, Labour formed a coalition government with New Zealand First and the Green Party. Whaitiri was Minister of Customs outside Cabinet. She also served as Associate Minister for Agriculture, Forestry, Local Government and Crown/Māori Relations. Alongside Willie Jackson, she co-chaired the Labour Māori Caucus.

On 30 August 2018, a staff member in Whaitiri's ministerial office alleged she was assaulted by the minister. Whaitiri was removed from her ministerial positions during an investigation and was not restored to them after the investigation found it "probable" that she had bruised the staffer. On 4 September 2020 the Governor-General granted Whaitiri retention of the title "The Honourable" in "recognition of her term as a member of the Executive Council".

After the 2020 general election, Whaitiri was reappointed as Minister of Customs and Associate Minister of Agriculture (with responsibility for animal welfare) while being appointed as Minister for Veterans and Associate Minister of Statistics. She additionally became Minister for Food Safety in June 2022.

References

External links
 
Labour Party profile

|-

1965 births
Living people
New Zealand Labour Party MPs
Government ministers of New Zealand
Lesbian politicians
LGBT members of the Parliament of New Zealand
Women members of the New Zealand House of Representatives
Members of the New Zealand House of Representatives
New Zealand MPs for Māori electorates
Ngāti Kahungunu people
Rongowhakaata people
People educated at Karamu High School
21st-century New Zealand politicians
21st-century New Zealand women politicians
Candidates in the 2017 New Zealand general election
Women government ministers of New Zealand
Halbert-Kohere family
Candidates in the 2020 New Zealand general election